Joseph Akin Murphy  (July 7, 1866 – March 28, 1951) was a pitcher for Major League Baseball in the 19th century. He played collegiate ball at Saint Louis University and played professionally for the Cincinnati Red Stockings, St. Louis Maroons and St. Louis Browns.

Sources

1866 births
1951 deaths
Baseball players from Missouri
19th-century baseball players
Saint Louis Billikens baseball players
St. Louis Maroons players
Cincinnati Red Stockings (AA) players
St. Louis Browns (AA) players
Sportspeople from Coral Gables, Florida
Chicago Whitings players